Corey Dalanelo Collymore (born 21 December 1977) is a former Barbadian cricketer, who represented the West Indies team in both Tests and ODIs cricket as seam bowler.

Collymore also played for Barbados, Warwickshire, Sussex and Middlesex in his cricketing career.

International career
Collymore made his test debut for the Windies in 1999 against Australia, where he bowled around the 90 mph mark. He soon suffered a near career ending back injury and was forced to remodel his bowling action. In so doing his pace was reduced though he enhanced his ability to swing and move the ball. He eventually recovered to solely feature in one day internationals for some time. As part of the West Indies' 2003 World Cup campaign, he was recalled to the Test team for the 2003 home series against Sri Lanka. After five wickets in the first innings of the first test in St Lucia, he led the charge in the second innings of the second test at Sabina Park, claiming 7 for 57, in helping the Windies to an eventual seven wicket victory over the Sri Lankans. Collymore was named man of the match and man of the series for his feats with the ball.

He later picked up a career best 11 wickets for the Windies, again at Sabina Park, in the second and final match of the 2005 test series against Pakistan.

Domestic career
In May 2008, Collymore joined Sussex as a Kolpak player in a one-year deal, replacing Australian allrounder Ryan Harris. He took 26 wickets at an average of 27.96 in his first season with the club. He eventually signed a one-year extension with the side for the 2009 season. Collymore then signed another one-year extension with Sussex for the following 2010 season. Collymore was a notable part of the Sussex team that won the 2010 Division 2 County Championship title, claiming 57 wickets at an average of 19.87 in what was eventually his last season with the side.

In September 2010 Collymore joined Middlesex County Cricket Club in a two-year deal to replace fellow Barbadian Pedro Collins. He became a notable player in Middlesex's campaign to successfully win the 2011 Division 2 County Championship title. On September 23, 2013, Collymore went on to receive a guard of honour in what was his final ever appearance for the club. All in all he picked up 86 wickets at an average of 29 in his three seasons with the side.

References

External links
Cricinfo profile

Barbados cricketers
Warwickshire cricketers
West Indies One Day International cricketers
West Indies Test cricketers
Barbadian cricketers
Cricketers at the 2003 Cricket World Cup
Cricketers at the 2007 Cricket World Cup
1977 births
Living people
Sussex cricketers
Middlesex cricketers